Movilla High School is a controlled, co-educational, secondary school with a five form entry situated on the Donaghadee Road in Newtownards, Northern Ireland. Mr Ian G Bell is principal.

Pastoral structure
Each one of the school's pupils is assigned to one of the four Houses: Victoria, Londonderry, Castle or Glen. Pupils attend House assemblies, taken by the Head of House, wears a house ties and competes in various inter-house competitions which can be sporting or non-sporting.

In the news
In October 2008, 25 teachers at the school went on strike over an incident of a pupil assaulting a member of the school's teaching staff.

Notable alumni
Martyn Irvine - professional cyclist - won gold at the 2013 UCI Track Cycling World Championships in the Scratch race and silver in the Individual Pursuit

References

Secondary schools in County Down